Cantharellus chicagoensis, the  Chicago chanterelle, is a species of Cantharellus from United States.

References

External links
 
 

chicagoensis
Fungi described in 2016
Fungi of North America